In rocketry, the Goddard problem is to optimize the peak altitude of a rocket, ascending vertically, and taking into account atmospheric drag and the gravitational field. This was first posed by Robert H. Goddard in his 1919 publication, "A Method of Reaching Extreme Altitudes".

References

Aerospace engineering